James II (14 October 1633 16 September 1701) was King of England and King of Ireland, and King of Scotland as James VII from the death of his elder brother, Charles II, on 6 February 1685. He was deposed in the Glorious Revolution of 1688. He was the last Catholic monarch of England, Scotland, and Ireland. His reign is now remembered primarily for conflicts over religious tolerance, but it also involved struggles over the principles of absolutism and the divine right of kings. His deposition ended a century of political and civil strife in England by confirming the primacy of the English Parliament over the Crown.

James succeeded to the thrones of England, Ireland, and Scotland following the death of his brother with widespread support in all three countries, largely because the principles of eligibility based on divine right and birth were widely accepted. Tolerance of his personal Catholicism did not extend to tolerance of Catholicism in general, and the English and Scottish parliaments refused to pass his measures. When James attempted to impose them by decree, this was met with opposition; some academics have however argued that it was a political principle, rather than a religious one, that ultimately led to his removal.

In June 1688, two events turned dissent into a crisis. Firstly, the birth of James's son and heir James Francis Edward on 10 June raised the prospect of establishing a Roman Catholic dynasty and excluding his Anglican daughter Mary and her Protestant husband William III of Orange from the line of succession. Secondly, the prosecution of the Seven Bishops for seditious libel was viewed as further evidence of an assault on the Church of England, and their acquittal on 30 June destroyed his political authority in England. The ensuing anti-Catholic riots in England and Scotland led to a general feeling that only James's removal from the throne could prevent a civil war.

Leading members of the English political class invited William of Orange to assume the English throne. When William landed in Brixham on 5 November 1688, James's army deserted and he went into exile in France on 23 December. In February 1689, a special Convention Parliament held that James had "vacated" the English throne and installed William and Mary as joint monarchs, thereby establishing the principle that sovereignty derived from Parliament, not birth. James landed in Ireland on 14 March 1689 in an attempt to recover his kingdoms, but, despite a simultaneous rising in Scotland, in April a Scottish Convention followed that of England, both finding that James had "forfeited" the throne and offered it to William and Mary. After his defeat at the Battle of the Boyne in July 1690, James returned to France, where he spent the rest of his life in exile at Saint-Germain, protected by Louis XIV. While his contemporary opponents often portrayed him as an absolutist tyrant, some historians – beginning in the 20th century – have praised James for advocating religious tolerance. More recent scholarship has tended to take a middle ground between these views.

Early life

Birth

James, the second surviving son of King Charles I and his wife, Henrietta Maria of France, was born at St James's Palace in London on 14 October 1633. Later that same year, he was baptized by William Laud, the Anglican Archbishop of Canterbury. He was educated by private tutors, along with his older brother, the future King Charles II, and the two sons of the Duke of Buckingham, George and Francis Villiers. At the age of three, James was appointed Lord High Admiral; the position was initially honorary, but became a substantive office after the Restoration, when James was an adult.

He was designated Duke of York at birth, invested with the Order of the Garter in 1642, and formally created Duke of York in January 1644.

Wars of the Three Kingdoms
In August 1642, long-running political disputes between Charles I and his opponents in Parliament led to the First English Civil War. James and his brother Charles were present at the Battle of Edgehill in October, and narrowly escaped capture by Parliamentarian cavalry. He spent most of the next four years in the Royalist wartime capital of Oxford, where he was made a Master of Arts by the University on 1 November 1642 and served as colonel of a volunteer regiment of foot. Following the surrender of Oxford in June 1646, James was taken to London and held with his younger siblings Henry, Elizabeth and Henrietta in St James's Palace.

Frustrated by their inability to agree terms with Charles I, and with his brother Charles out of reach in France, Parliament considered making James king. James was ordered by his father to escape, and, with the help of Joseph Bampfield, in April 1648 successfully evaded his guards and crossed the North Sea to The Hague. Following their victory in the 1648 Second English Civil War, Parliament ordered the Execution of Charles I in January 1649. The Covenanter regime proclaimed Charles II King of Scotland, and after lengthy negotiations agreed to provide troops to restore him to the English throne. The invasion ended in defeat at Worcester in September 1651. Although Charles managed to escape capture and to return to the exiled court in Paris, the Royalist cause appeared hopeless.

Exile in France

James, like his brother, sought refuge in France, serving in the French army under Turenne against the Fronde, and later against their Spanish allies. In the French army James had his first true experience of battle, in which, according to one observer, he "ventures himself and chargeth gallantly where anything is to be done". Turenne's favour led to James being given command of a captured Irish regiment in December 1652, and being appointed Lieutenant-General in 1654.

In the meantime, Charles was attempting to reclaim his throne, but France, although hosting the exiles, had allied itself with Oliver Cromwell. In 1656, Charles turned instead to Spain – an enemy of France – for support, and an alliance was made. In consequence, James was expelled from France and forced to leave Turenne's army. James quarrelled with his brother over the diplomatic choice of Spain over France. Exiled and poor, there was little that either Charles or James could do about the wider political situation, and James ultimately travelled to Bruges and (along with his younger brother, Henry) joined the Spanish army under the Prince of Condé in Flanders, where he was given command as Captain-General of six regiments of British volunteers and fought against his former French comrades at the Battle of the Dunes.

During his service in the Spanish army, James became friendly with two Irish Catholic brothers in the Royalist entourage, Peter and Richard Talbot, and became somewhat estranged from his brother's Anglican advisers. In 1659, the French and Spanish made peace by the Treaty of the Pyrenees. James, doubtful of his brother's chances of regaining the throne, considered taking a Spanish offer to be an admiral in their navy. Ultimately, he declined the position; by the next year the situation in England had changed, and Charles II was proclaimed King.

Restoration

First marriage

After the collapse of the Commonwealth in 1660, Charles II was restored to the English throne. Although James was the heir presumptive, it seemed unlikely that he would inherit the Crown, as Charles was still a young man capable of fathering children. On 31 December 1660, following his brother's restoration, James was created Duke of Albany in Scotland, to go along with his English title, Duke of York. Upon his return to England, James prompted an immediate controversy by announcing his engagement to Anne Hyde, the daughter of Charles's chief minister, Edward Hyde.

In 1659, while trying to seduce her, James promised he would marry Anne. Anne became pregnant in 1660, but following the Restoration and James's return to power, no one at the royal court expected a prince to marry a commoner, no matter what he had pledged beforehand. Although nearly everyone, including Anne's father, urged the two not to marry, the couple married secretly, then went through an official marriage ceremony on 3 September 1660 in London.

Their first child, Charles, was born less than two months later, but died in infancy, as did five further children. Only two daughters survived: Mary (born 30 April 1662) and Anne (born 6 February 1665). Samuel Pepys wrote that James was fond of his children and his role as a father, and played with them "like an ordinary private father of a child", a contrast to the distant parenting common with royalty at the time.

James's wife was devoted to him and influenced many of his decisions. Even so, he kept mistresses, including Arabella Churchill and Catherine Sedley, and was reputed to be "the most unguarded ogler of his time". Samuel Pepys recorded in his diary that James "did eye my wife mightily". James's taste in women was often maligned, with Gilbert Burnet famously remarking that James's mistresses must have been "given [to] him by his priests as a penance". Anne Hyde died in 1671.

Military and political offices and royal slavery

After the Restoration, James was confirmed as Lord High Admiral, an office that carried with it the subsidiary appointments of Governor of Portsmouth and Lord Warden of the Cinque Ports. Charles II also made his brother the Governor of the Royal Adventurers into Africa (later shortened to the Royal African Company) in October 1660, an office James retained until after the Glorious Revolution when he was forced to resign. When James commanded the Royal Navy during the Second Anglo-Dutch War (1665–1667) he immediately directed the fleet towards the capture of forts off the African coast that would facilitate English involvement in the slave trade (indeed English attacks on such forts occupied by the Dutch precipitated the war itself). James remained Admiral of the Fleet during the Third Anglo-Dutch War (1672–1674), during which significant fighting also occurred off the African coast. Following the raid on the Medway in 1667, James oversaw the survey and re-fortification of the southern coast. The office of Lord High Admiral, combined with his revenue from post office and wine tariffs (positions granted him by Charles II upon his restoration) gave James enough money to keep a sizeable court household.

In 1664, Charles II granted American territory between the Delaware and Connecticut rivers to James. Following its capture by the British, the former Dutch territory of New Netherland and its principal port, New Amsterdam, were renamed the Province and City of New York in James's honour. James gave part of the colony to proprietors George Carteret and John Berkeley. In 1683, James became the Governor of the Hudson's Bay Company, but did not take an active role in its governance.

In September 1666, Charles II put James in charge of firefighting operations during the Great Fire of London, in the absence of action by Lord Mayor Thomas Bloodworth. This was not a political office, but his actions and leadership were noteworthy. "The Duke of York hath won the hearts of the people with his continual and indefatigable pains day and night in helping to quench the Fire", wrote a witness in a letter on 8 September.

In 1672, the Royal African Company received a new charter from Charles II. It set up forts and factories, maintained troops, and exercised martial law in West Africa in pursuit of trade in gold, silver, and African slaves. In the 1680s, the RAC transported about 5,000 slaves a year to markets primarily in the English Caribbean across the Atlantic. Many were branded on the chest with the letters "DY" for "Duke of York", the RAC's Governor. As historian William Pettigrew writes, the RAC "shipped more enslaved African women, men, and children to the Americas than any other single institution during the entire period of the transatlantic slave trade".

Conversion to Roman Catholicism and second marriage

James's time in France had exposed him to the beliefs and ceremonies of the Roman Catholic Church, and both he and his wife, Anne, became drawn to that faith. James took Catholic Eucharist in 1668 or 1669, although his conversion was kept secret for almost a decade as he continued to attend Anglican services until 1676. In spite of his conversion, James continued to associate primarily with Anglicans, including John Churchill and George Legge, as well as French Protestants, such as Louis de Duras, the Earl of Feversham.

Growing fears of Roman Catholic influence at court led the English Parliament to introduce a new Test Act in 1673. Under this Act, all civil and military officials were required to take an oath (in which they were required to disavow the doctrine of transubstantiation and denounce certain practices of the Roman Church as superstitious and idolatrous) and to receive the Eucharist under the auspices of the Church of England. James refused to perform either action, instead choosing to relinquish the post of Lord High Admiral. His conversion to Roman Catholicism was thereby made public.

King Charles II opposed James's conversion, ordering that James's daughters, Mary and Anne, be raised in the Church of England. Nevertheless, he allowed the widowed James to marry Mary of Modena, a fifteen-year-old Italian princess. James and Mary were married by proxy in a Roman Catholic ceremony on 20 September 1673. On 21 November, Mary arrived in England and Nathaniel Crew, Bishop of Oxford, performed a brief Anglican service that did little more than recognise the marriage by proxy. Many British people, distrustful of Catholicism, regarded the new Duchess of York as an agent of the Papacy. James was noted for his deep devotion, once remarking, "If occasion were, I hope God would give me his grace to suffer death for the true Catholic religion as well as banishment."

Exclusion Crisis

In 1677, King Charles II arranged for James's daughter Mary to marry the Protestant Prince William III of Orange, son of Charles's and James's sister Mary. James reluctantly acquiesced after his brother and nephew had agreed to the marriage. Despite the Protestant marriage, fears of a potential Catholic monarch persisted, intensified by the failure of Charles II and his wife, Catherine of Braganza, to produce any children. A defrocked Anglican clergyman, Titus Oates, spoke of a "Popish Plot" to kill Charles and to put the Duke of York on the throne. The fabricated plot caused a wave of anti-Catholic hysteria to sweep across the nation.

In England, the Earl of Shaftesbury, a former government minister and now a leading opponent of Catholicism, proposed an Exclusion Bill that would have excluded James from the line of succession. Some members of Parliament even proposed to pass the crown to Charles's illegitimate son, James Scott, 1st Duke of Monmouth. In 1679, with the Exclusion Bill in danger of passing, Charles II dissolved Parliament. Two further Parliaments were elected in 1680 and 1681, but were dissolved for the same reason. The Exclusion Crisis contributed to the development of the English two-party system: the Whigs were those who supported the Bill, while the Tories were those who opposed it. Ultimately, the succession was not altered, but James was convinced to withdraw from all policy-making bodies and to accept a lesser role in his brother's government.

On the orders of the King, James left England for Brussels. In 1680, he was appointed Lord High Commissioner of Scotland and took up residence at the Holyrood Palace in Edinburgh to suppress an uprising and oversee the royal government. James returned to England for a time when Charles was stricken ill and appeared to be near death. The hysteria of the accusations eventually faded, but James's relations with many in the English Parliament, including the Earl of Danby, a former ally, were forever strained and a solid segment turned against him.

On 6 May 1682 James narrowly escaped the sinking of HMS Gloucester, in which between 130 and 250 people perished. James argued with the pilot about the navigation of the ship before it ran aground on a sandbank, and then delayed abandoning ship, which may have contributed to the death toll.

Return to favour
In 1683, a plot was uncovered to assassinate Charles II and his brother and spark a republican revolution to re-establish a government of the Cromwellian style. The conspiracy, known as the Rye House Plot, backfired upon its conspirators and provoked a wave of sympathy for the King and James. Several notable Whigs, including the Earl of Essex and the King's illegitimate son, the Duke of Monmouth, were implicated. Monmouth initially confessed to complicity in the plot and implicated fellow conspirators, but later recanted. Essex committed suicide, and Monmouth, along with several others, was obliged to flee into exile in continental Europe. Charles II reacted to the plot by increasing the repression of Whigs and dissenters. Taking advantage of James's rebounding popularity, Charles invited him back onto the Privy Council in 1684. While some in the English Parliament remained wary of the possibility of a Roman Catholic king, the threat of excluding James from the throne had passed.

Reign

Accession to the throne

Charles II died on 6 February 1685 from apoplexy, after supposedly converting to Catholicism on his deathbed. Having no legitimate children, he was succeeded by his brother James, who reigned in England and Ireland as James II, and in Scotland as James VII. There was little initial opposition to James's accession, and there were widespread reports of public rejoicing at the orderly succession. He wished to proceed quickly to the coronation, and he and Mary were crowned at Westminster Abbey on 23 April 1685.

The new Parliament that assembled in May 1685, which gained the name of "Loyal Parliament", was initially favourable to James, who had stated that most former exclusionists would be forgiven if they acquiesced to his rule. Most of Charles's officers continued in office, the exceptions being the promotion of James's brothers-in-law, the earls of Clarendon and Rochester, and the demotion of Halifax. Parliament granted James a generous life income, including all of the proceeds of tonnage and poundage and the customs duties. James worked harder as king than his brother had, but was less willing to compromise when his advisers disagreed with his policies.

Two rebellions

Soon after becoming king, James faced a rebellion in southern England led by his nephew, the Duke of Monmouth, and another rebellion in Scotland led by Archibald Campbell, the Earl of Argyll. Monmouth and Argyll both began their expeditions from Holland, where James's nephew and son-in-law, the Prince of Orange, had neglected to detain them or put a stop to their recruitment efforts.

Argyll sailed to Scotland where he raised recruits, mainly from his own clan, the Campbells. The rebellion was quickly crushed, and Argyll was captured at Inchinnan on 18 June 1685. Having arrived with fewer than 300 men and unable to convince many more to flock to his standard, he never posed a credible threat to James. Argyll was taken as a prisoner to Edinburgh. A new trial was not commenced because Argyll had previously been tried and sentenced to death. The King confirmed the earlier death sentence and ordered that it be carried out within three days of receiving the confirmation.

Monmouth's rebellion was coordinated with Argyll's, but was more dangerous to James. Monmouth had proclaimed himself King at Lyme Regis on 11 June. He attempted to raise recruits but was unable to gather enough rebels to defeat even James's small standing army. Monmouth's soldiers attacked the King's army at night, in an attempt at surprise, but were defeated at the Battle of Sedgemoor. The King's forces, led by Feversham and Churchill, quickly dispersed the ill-prepared rebels. Monmouth was captured and later executed at the Tower of London on 15 July. The King's judges—most notably, George Jeffreys—condemned many of the rebels to transportation and indentured servitude in the West Indies in a series of trials that came to be known as the Bloody Assizes. Around 250 of the rebels were executed. While both rebellions were defeated easily, they hardened James's resolve against his enemies and increased his suspicion of the Dutch.

Religious liberty and dispensing power
To protect himself from further rebellions, James sought safety by enlarging his standing army. This alarmed his subjects, not only because of the trouble soldiers caused in the towns, but because it was against the English tradition to keep a professional army in peacetime. Even more alarming to Parliament was James's use of his dispensing power to allow Roman Catholics to command several regiments without having to take the oath mandated by the Test Act. When even the previously supportive Parliament objected to these measures, James ordered Parliament prorogued in November 1685, never to meet again in his reign. At the beginning of 1686, two papers were found in Charles II's strong box and his closet, in his own hand, stating the arguments for Catholicism over Protestantism. James published these papers with a declaration signed by his sign manual and challenged the Archbishop of Canterbury and the whole Anglican episcopal bench to refute Charles's arguments: "Let me have a solid answer, and in a gentlemanlike style; and it may have the effect which you so much desire of bringing me over to your church." The Archbishop refused on the grounds of respect for the late king.

James advocated repeal of the penal laws in all three of his kingdoms, but in the early years of his reign he refused to allow those dissenters who did not petition for relief to receive it. James sent a letter to the Scottish Parliament at its opening in 1685, declaring his wish for new penal laws against refractory Presbyterians and lamented that he was not there in person to promote such a law. In response, the Parliament passed an Act that stated, "whoever should preach in a conventicle under a roof, or should attend, either as preacher or as a hearer, a conventicle in the open air, should be punished with death and confiscation of property". In March 1686, James sent a letter to the Scottish Privy Council advocating toleration for Roman Catholics but not for rebellious Presbyterian Covenanters. Presbyterians would later call this period "The Killing Time".

James allowed Roman Catholics to occupy the highest offices of his kingdoms, and received at his court the papal nuncio, Ferdinando d'Adda, the first representative from Rome to London since the reign of Mary I. Edward Petre, James's Jesuit confessor, was a particular object of Anglican ire. When the King's Secretary of State, the Earl of Sunderland, began replacing office-holders at court with "Papist" favourites, James began to lose the confidence of many of his Anglican supporters. Sunderland's purge of office-holders even extended to the King's brothers-in-law (the Hydes) and their supporters. Roman Catholics made up no more than one-fiftieth of the English population. In May 1686, James sought to obtain a ruling from the English common-law courts that showed he had the power to dispense with Acts of Parliament. He dismissed judges who disagreed with him on this matter, as well as the Solicitor General, Heneage Finch. The case of Godden v. Hales affirmed his dispensing power, with eleven out of the twelve judges ruling in the king's favour.

In 1687, James issued the Declaration of Indulgence, also known as the Declaration for Liberty of Conscience, in which he used his dispensing power to negate the effect of laws punishing both Roman Catholics and Protestant Dissenters. In the summer of 1687 he attempted to increase support for his tolerationist policy by a speaking tour of the western counties of England. As part of this tour, he gave a speech at Chester in which he said, "suppose... there should be a law made that all black men should be imprisoned, it would be unreasonable and we had as little reason to quarrel with other men for being of different [religious] opinions as for being of different complexions." At the same time, James provided partial toleration in Scotland, using his dispensing power to grant relief to Roman Catholics and partial relief to Presbyterians.

In 1688, James ordered the Declaration read from the pulpits of every Anglican church, further alienating the Anglican bishops against the Supreme Governor of their church. While the Declaration elicited some thanks from its beneficiaries, it left the Established Church, the traditional ally of the monarchy, in the difficult position of being forced to erode its own privileges. James provoked further opposition by attempting to reduce the Anglican monopoly on education. At the University of Oxford, he offended Anglicans by allowing Roman Catholics to hold important positions in Christ Church and University College, two of Oxford's largest colleges. He also attempted to force the Fellows of Magdalen College to elect as their President Anthony Farmer, a man of generally ill repute who was believed to be a Roman Catholic, which was seen as a violation of the Fellows' right to elect someone of their own choosing.

In 1687, James prepared to pack Parliament with his supporters, so that it would repeal the Test Act and the Penal Laws. James was convinced by addresses from Dissenters that he had their support and so could dispense with relying on Tories and Anglicans. He instituted a wholesale purge of those in offices under the Crown opposed to his plan, appointing new lord-lieutenants of counties and remodelling the corporations governing towns and livery companies. In October, James gave orders for the lord-lieutenants to provide three standard questions to all Justices of the Peace: 1. Would they consent to the repeal of the Test Act and the Penal Laws? 2. Would they assist candidates who would do so? 3. Would they accept the Declaration of Indulgence? During the first three months of 1688, hundreds of those who gave negative replies to those questions were dismissed. Corporations were purged by agents, known as the Regulators, who were given wide discretionary powers, in an attempt to create a permanent royal electoral machine. Most of the regulators were Baptists, and the new town officials that they recommended included Quakers, Baptists, Congregationalists, Presbyterians and Roman Catholics, as well as Anglicans. Finally, on 24 August 1688, James ordered the issue of writs for a general election. However, upon realising in September that William of Orange was going to land in England, James withdrew the writs and subsequently wrote to the lord-lieutenants to inquire over allegations of abuses committed during the regulations and election preparations, as part of the concessions he made to win support.

Deposition and the Glorious Revolution 

In April 1688, James re-issued the Declaration of Indulgence, subsequently ordering Anglican clergy to read it in their churches. When seven Bishops, including the Archbishop of Canterbury, submitted a petition requesting the reconsideration of the King's religious policies, they were arrested and tried for seditious libel. Public alarm increased when Queen Mary gave birth to a Roman Catholic son and heir, James Francis Edward, on 10 June that year. When James's only possible successors were his two Protestant daughters, Anglicans could see his pro-Catholic policies as a temporary phenomenon, but when the prince's birth opened the possibility of a permanent Roman Catholic dynasty, such men had to reconsider their position. Threatened by a Roman Catholic dynasty, several influential Protestants claimed the child was supposititious and had been smuggled into the Queen's bedchamber in a warming pan. They had already entered into negotiations with the Prince of Orange when it became known the Queen was pregnant, and the birth of a son reinforced their convictions.

On 30 June 1688, a group of seven Protestant nobles invited William, Prince of Orange, to come to England with an army. By September, it had become clear that William sought to invade. Believing that his own army would be adequate, James refused the assistance of King Louis XIV of France, fearing that the English would oppose French intervention. When William arrived on 5 November 1688, many Protestant officers, including Churchill, defected and joined William, as did James's own daughter, Anne. James lost his nerve and declined to attack the invading army, despite his army's numerical superiority. On 11 December, James tried to flee to France, first throwing the Great Seal of the Realm into the River Thames. He was captured in Kent; later, he was released and placed under Dutch protective guard. Having no desire to make James a martyr, William let him escape on 23 December. James was received by his cousin and ally, Louis XIV, who offered him a palace and a pension.

William summoned a Convention Parliament to decide how to handle James's flight. It convened on 22 January 1689. While the Parliament refused to depose him, they declared that James, having fled to France and dropped the Great Seal into the Thames, had effectively abdicated, and that the throne had thereby become vacant. To fill this vacancy, James's daughter Mary was declared Queen; she was to rule jointly with her husband William, who would be King. On 11 April 1689, the Parliament of Scotland declared James to have forfeited the throne of Scotland as well. The Convention Parliament issued a Declaration of Right  on 12 February that denounced James for abusing his power, and proclaimed many limitations on royal authority. The abuses charged to James included the suspension of the Test Acts, the prosecution of the Seven Bishops for merely petitioning the Crown, the establishment of a standing army, and the imposition of cruel punishments. The Declaration was the basis for the Bill of Rights enacted later in 1689. The Bill also declared that henceforth, no Roman Catholic was permitted to ascend the English throne, nor could any English monarch marry a Roman Catholic.

Attempt to regain the throne

War in Ireland 

With the assistance of French troops, James landed in Ireland in March 1689. The Irish Parliament did not follow the example of the English Parliament; it declared that James remained King and passed a massive bill of attainder against those who had rebelled against him. At James's urging, the Irish Parliament passed an Act for Liberty of Conscience that granted religious freedom to all Roman Catholics and Protestants in Ireland. James worked to build an army in Ireland, but was ultimately defeated at the Battle of the Boyne on 1 July 1690 O.S. when William arrived, personally leading an army to defeat James and reassert English control. James fled to France once more, departing from Kinsale, never to return to any of his former kingdoms. Because he deserted his Irish supporters, James became known in Ireland as Séamus an Chaca or "James the shit". Despite this popular perception, later historian Breandán Ó Buachalla argues that "Irish political poetry for most of the eighteenth century is essentially Jacobite poetry", and both Ó Buachalla and fellow-historian Éamonn Ó Ciardha argue that James and his successors played a central role as messianic figures throughout the eighteenth century for all classes in Ireland.

Return to exile, death, and legacy 

In France, James was allowed to live in the royal château of Saint-Germain-en-Laye. James's wife and some of his supporters fled with him, including the Earl of Melfort; most, but not all, were Roman Catholic. In 1692, James's last child, Louisa Maria Teresa, was born. Some supporters in England attempted to assassinate William III to restore James to the throne in 1696, but the plot failed and the backlash made James's cause less popular. In the same year, Louis XIV offered to have James elected King of Poland. James rejected the offer, fearing that accepting the Polish crown might (in the minds of the English people) disqualify him from being King of England. After Louis concluded peace with William in 1697, he ceased to offer much assistance to James.

During his last years, James lived as an austere penitent. He wrote a memorandum for his son advising him on how to govern England, specifying that Catholics should possess one Secretary of State, one Commissioner of the Treasury, the Secretary at War, with the majority of the officers in the army.

He died aged 67 of a brain haemorrhage on 16 September 1701 at Saint-Germain-en-Laye. James's heart was placed in a silver-gilt locket and given to the convent at Chaillot, and his brain was placed in a lead casket and given to the Scots College in Paris. His entrails were placed in two gilt urns and sent to the parish church of Saint-Germain-en-Laye and the English Jesuit college at Saint-Omer, while the flesh from his right arm was given to the English Augustinian nuns of Paris.

The rest of James's body was laid to rest in a triple sarcophagus (consisting of two wooden coffins and one of lead) at the St Edmund's Chapel in the Church of the English Benedictines in the Rue Saint-Jacques, Paris, with a funeral oration by Henri-Emmanuel de Roquette. James was not buried, but put in one of the side chapels. Lights were kept burning round his coffin until the French Revolution. In 1734, the Archbishop of Paris heard evidence to support James's canonisation, but nothing came of it. During the French Revolution, James's tomb was raided.

Later Hanover succession 

James's younger daughter Anne succeeded when William died in 1702. The Act of Settlement provided that, if the line of succession established in the Bill of Rights were extinguished, the crown would go to a German cousin, Sophia, Electress of Hanover, and to her Protestant heirs. Sophia was a granddaughter of James VI and I through his eldest daughter, Elizabeth Stuart, the sister of Charles I. Thus, when Anne died in 1714 (less than two months after the death of Sophia), she was succeeded by George I, Sophia's son, the Elector of Hanover and Anne's second cousin.

Subsequent uprisings and pretenders 
James's son James Francis Edward was recognised as king at his father's death by Louis XIV of France and James's remaining supporters (later known as Jacobites) as "James III and VIII". He led a rising in Scotland in 1715 shortly after George I's accession, but was defeated. Jacobites rose again in 1745 led by Charles Edward Stuart, James II's grandson, and were again defeated. The risings were the last serious attempts to restore the Stuart dynasty.

Charles's claims passed to his younger brother Henry Benedict Stuart, the Dean of the College of Cardinals of the Roman Catholic Church. Henry was the last of James II's legitimate descendants, and no relative has publicly acknowledged the Jacobite claim since his death in 1807.

Historiography

Historical analysis of James II has been somewhat revised since Whig historians, led by Lord Macaulay, cast James as a cruel absolutist and his reign as "tyranny which approached to insanity". Subsequent scholars, such as G. M. Trevelyan (Macaulay's great-nephew) and David Ogg, while more balanced than Macaulay, still characterised James as a tyrant, his attempts at religious tolerance as a fraud, and his reign as an aberration in the course of British history. In 1892, A. W. Ward wrote for the Dictionary of National Biography that James was "obviously a political and religious bigot", although never devoid of "a vein of patriotic sentiment"; "his conversion to the church of Rome made the emancipation of his fellow-catholics in the first instance, and the recovery of England for catholicism in the second, the governing objects of his policy."

Hilaire Belloc, a writer and Catholic apologist, broke with this tradition in 1928, casting James as an honourable man and a true advocate for freedom of conscience, and his enemies "men in the small clique of great fortunes ... which destroyed the ancient monarchy of the English". However, he observed that James "concluded the Catholic church to be the sole authoritative voice on earth, and thenceforward ... he not only stood firm against surrender but on no single occasion contemplated the least compromise or by a word would modify the impression made."

By the 1960s and 1970s, Maurice Ashley and Stuart Prall began to reconsider James's motives in granting religious toleration, while still taking note of James's autocratic rule. Modern historians have moved away from the school of thought that preached the continuous march of progress and democracy, Ashley contending that "history is, after all, the story of human beings and individuals, as well as of the classes and the masses." He cast James II and William III as "men of ideals as well as human weaknesses". John Miller, writing in 2000, accepted the claims of James's absolutism, but argued that "his main concern was to secure religious liberty and civil equality for Catholics. Any 'absolutist' methods ... were essentially means to that end."

In 2004, W. A. Speck wrote in the new Oxford Dictionary of National Biography that "James was genuinely committed to religious toleration, but also sought to increase the power of the crown." He added that, unlike the government of the Netherlands, "James was too autocratic to combine freedom of conscience with popular government. He resisted any check on the monarch's power. That is why his heart was not in the concessions he had to make in 1688. He would rather live in exile with his principles intact than continue to reign as a limited monarch."

Tim Harris's conclusions from his 2006 book summarised the ambivalence of modern scholarship towards James II:

In 2009, Steven Pincus confronted that scholarly ambivalence in 1688: The First Modern Revolution. Pincus claims that James's reign must be understood within a context of economic change and European politics, and makes two major assertions about James II. The first of these is that James purposefully "followed the French Sun King, Louis XIV, in trying to create a modern Catholic polity. This involved not only trying to Catholicize England ... but also creating a modern, centralizing, and extremely bureaucratic state apparatus." The second is that James was undone in 1688 far less by Protestant reaction against Catholicization than by nationwide hostile reaction against his intrusive bureaucratic state and taxation apparatus, expressed in massive popular support for William of Orange's armed invasion of England. Pincus presents James as neither naïve nor stupid nor egotistical. Instead, readers are shown an intelligent, clear-thinking strategically motivated monarch whose vision for a French authoritarian political model and alliance clashed with, and lost out to, alternative views that favoured an entrepreneurial Dutch economic model, feared French power, and were outraged by James's authoritarianism.

Scott Sowerby countered Pincus's thesis in 2013 in Making Toleration: The Repealers and the Glorious Revolution. He noted that English taxes remained low during James II's reign, at about 4% of the English national income, and thus it was unlikely that James could have built a bureaucratic state on the model of Louis XIV's France, where taxes were at least twice as high as a proportion of GDP. Sowerby also contends that James's policies of religious toleration attracted substantial support from religious nonconformists, including Quakers, Baptists, Congregationalists and Presbyterians, who were attracted by the king's push for a new "Magna Carta for liberty of conscience". The king was overthrown, in Sowerby's view, largely because of fears among the Dutch and English elites that James might be aligning himself with Louis XIV in a supposed "holy league" to destroy Protestantism across northern Europe. Sowerby presents James's reign as a struggle between those who believed that the king was sincerely devoted to liberty of conscience and those who were sceptical of the king's espousals of toleration and believed that he had a hidden agenda to overthrow English Protestantism.

Titles, styles, honours, and arms

Titles and styles
 14 October 1633 – 6 February 1685:  The Duke of York
 10 May 1659 – 6 February 1685: The Earl of Ulster
 31 December 1660 – 6 February 1685:  The Duke of Albany
 6 February 1685 – 23 December 1688 (by Jacobites until 16 September 1701): His Majesty The King

The official style of James in England was "James the Second, by the Grace of God, King of England, Scotland, France and Ireland, Defender of the Faith, etc." The claim to France was only nominal, and was asserted by every English king from Edward III to George III, regardless of the amount of French territory actually controlled. In Scotland, he was "James the Seventh, by the Grace of God, King of Scotland, England, France and Ireland, Defender of the Faith, etc."

James was created "Duke of Normandy" by King Louis XIV of France on 31 December 1660.

In 1734 the Archbishop of Paris opened the cause for the canonisation of James as a saint, making him a Servant of God among Catholics.

Honours
 KG: Knight of the Garter, 20 April 1642

Arms
Prior to his accession, James's coat of arms was the royal arms (which he later inherited), differenced by a label of three points Ermine. His arms as king were: Quarterly, I and IV Grandquarterly, Azure three fleurs-de-lis Or (for France) and Gules three lions passant guardant in pale Or (for England); II Or a lion rampant within a double tressure flory-counter-flory Gules (for Scotland); III Azure a harp Or stringed Argent (for Ireland).

Family tree 
In four generations of Stuarts, there were seven reigning monarchs (not including Hanover's George I). James II was the fourth Stuart monarch, the second of his generation and the father of two more.

Issue

Legitimate issue

Illegitimate issue

Notes

Sources

References

Further reading
 
 DeKrey, Gary S. (2008). "Between Revolutions: Re-appraising the Restoration in Britain" History Compass 6 (3): 738–773.
 Earle, Peter (1972). The Life and Times of James II. London: Weidenfeld & Nicolson.
 Glassey, Lionel, ed. (1997). The Reigns of Charles II and James VII and II.
 Goodlad, Graham (2007). "Before the Glorious Revolution: The Making of Absolute Monarchy? Graham Goodlad Examines the Controversies Surrounding the Development of Royal Power under Charles II and James II" History Review 58: 10 ff.
 Johnson, Richard R. (1978). "Politics Redefined: An Assessment of Recent Writings on the Late Stuart Period of English History, 1660 to 1714." William and Mary Quarterly 35 (4): 691–732. 
 
 
 Mullett, M. (1993). James II and English Politics 1678–1688. .
 Ogg, David (1957). England in the Reigns of James II and William III, 2nd ed. Oxford: Clarendon Press.
 Van der Kiste, John (2021). James II and the first modern revolution. Barnsley: Pen & Sword.
 Walcott, Robert (1962). "The Later Stuarts (1660–1714): Significant Work of the Last Twenty Years (1939–1959)" American Historical Review 67 (2): 352–370

External links

 James VII & II at the official website of the British monarchy
 James II at the official website of the Royal Collection Trust
 James II at BBC History
 King James II at the National Portrait Gallery, London

 
1633 births
1701 deaths
17th-century English monarchs
17th-century Scottish monarchs
17th-century Irish monarchs
18th-century British people
17th-century English nobility
17th-century Scottish peers
Dukes of Normandy
Jacobite pretenders
18th-century Jacobite pretenders
James II and VII
British Roman Catholics
Converts to Roman Catholicism from Anglicanism
Dukes of York
Peers of England created by Charles I
Dukes of Albany
Peers of Scotland created by Charles II
Ulster
Earls of Ulster
Peers of Ireland created by Charles II
English pretenders to the French throne
English people of Scottish descent
English people of French descent
Fellows of the Royal Society
People of the Glorious Revolution
Governors of the Hudson's Bay Company
History of Catholicism in the United Kingdom
House of Stuart
Jacobite military personnel of the Williamite War in Ireland
Knights of the Garter
Lord High Admirals of England
Lord High Admirals of Scotland
Lords High Commissioner to the Parliament of Scotland
Lords Warden of the Cinque Ports
Pre-statehood history of New York (state)
Princes of England
Princes of Scotland
Roman Catholic monarchs
Children of Charles I of England
Sons of kings